is a railway station on the Ibara Railway Ibara Line located in Fukuyama, Hiroshima Prefecture, Japan.

The station opened on January 11, 1999, the date of inauguration of the Ibara Line.

External links
  井原線沿線　路線観光案内

Railway stations in Hiroshima Prefecture
Railway stations in Japan opened in 1999
Ibara Railway Ibara Line